Alexia Bohwim  or Alexia Knutsdatter Bohwim (born March 13, 1969 in Oslo) is a Norwegian writer, animal rights activist and feminist.

Life 
Bohwim made her debut in 2008 with the cult novel Frognerfitter. The book is about two girlfriends Billie and Susie, who live at Frogner in Oslo (where Bohwim grew up), and describes their lifestyle which includes a lot of drinking and sex, and addresses some of the myths that exist about people who live there. The book was published by Kagge Forlag and sold 40,000 copies. 

Since then, Bohwim has written two books, MILF (2010) and Golddigger (2012), and has created a blog. This was later censored and banned. She has acquired the reputation of being outspoken and controversial. She has outspoken views about sex roles, life in Frogner and feminism. 

For over four years, filmmaker Nina Grünfeld has followed Bohwim, and created a documentary about her life. The idea was to follow her for at least ten years, then to make a cinema documentary about living a different life. Over the years, she has been half-naked in several magazines, and describes herself as "a narcissist with empathy".

Bohwim has studied Norwegian movie history, movie history and is currently writing about the links between the deportation of the Norwegian jews and the cultural elite. 

Frogner Babylon came September 2021 and is a sequel to Frognerfitter.   

Bohwim is an animal rights activist and loves Fred Perry and tennis.

Family 
Bohwim's father is film director Knut Bohwim.

Works
 Frognerfitter : roman  Oslo : Kagge, 2008. 
 MILF roman, Oslo Kagge 2010. 
 Golddigger roman,  Oslo Kagge 2012. 
Frogner Babylon, roman, Cappelen Damm 2021

References

External links
 Official website  

1969 births
Living people
Writers from Oslo
Feminist writers
Norwegian novelists
Animal rights activists